Jordan Massengo (born 31 January 1990) is a Congolese professional footballer who plays as a defensive midfielder. He currently plays for RWDM47 in the Belgian First Amateur Division.

Club career
Massengo made his debut for Istres in the 1–1 draw away at Sedan on 2 April 2010, playing 53 minutes, before being replaced by Adel Chedli. He went on to play 22 matches for the side during the 2010–11 season, scoring the first goal of his career in the draw against Dijon on 20 August 2010, after coming on as a half-time substitute for Abdelnasser Ouadah. The following year, he was loaned out to Championnat National club Besançon, where he made 20 league appearances, before returning to Istres in the summer of 2012.

International career
Massengo was called up by Congo and was an unused substitute in a 2017 Africa Cup of Nations qualifying game against Kenya in June 2015. Massengo made his debut for Congo in a 2017 Africa Cup of Nations qualification 1-1 match against Zambia, wherein he scored his first goal for the team.

International goals
Scores and results list Congo's goal tally first.

References

External links
Jordan Massengo career statistics at foot-national.com

1990 births
Living people
Republic of the Congo footballers
Republic of the Congo international footballers
French footballers
French sportspeople of Republic of the Congo descent
Association football midfielders
FC Istres players
Racing Besançon players
Vannes OC players
R.A.E.C. Mons players
Royale Union Saint-Gilloise players
Ligue 2 players
Challenger Pro League players
Championnat National players
RWDM47 players
Black French sportspeople